is a Japanese manga series written and illustrated by Masaharu Noritsuke. It follows a 24-year-old Afro-haired young man named Hiroshi Tanaka who falls in love for the first time. It has been serialized in Shogakukan's seinen manga magazine Big Comic Spirits since 2001, spawning six series. A live action film adaptation premiered in February 2012.

Media

Manga
It has been divided into seven parts:
 (2001–2004, 10 volumes)
 (2004–2007, 10 volumes)
 (2007–2010, 10 volumes)
 (2010–2013, 10 volumes)
 (2015–2018, 10 volumes)
 (2018–2021, 10 volumes)
 (2022–present)

Film
A film directed by Daigo Matsui, based on Jōkyō Afro Tanaka story was released on February 18, 2012, by Showgate. The theme song of the film is "Yoru wo Koete" by Tsuru. Afro Tanaka was released in DVD and Blu-ray by Happinet on August 2, 2012. The film also spawned a spin-off: a 10-episodes mini-drama entitled Hōkago Afro Tanaka.

Reception
The Afro Tanaka manga has sold 3.6 million units in Japan as of May 2013. In 2008, the third manga series, Jōkyō Afro Tanaka, was nominated in the manga category at the 12th Japan Media Arts Festival Awards. The film debuted at number 10 in Japanese theaters. Afro Tanaka grossed over $1.8 million in Japan.

Notes

References

External links
 Afro Tanaka film's official site (Archive)
 
 

2002 manga
2004 manga
2007 manga
Comedy anime and manga
Films directed by Daigo Matsui
Japanese comedy films
Live-action films based on manga
Manga adapted into films
Seinen manga
Shogakukan franchises
Shogakukan manga
2010s Japanese films